Jaisalmer , nicknamed "The Golden city", is a city in the Indian state of Rajasthan, located  west of the state capital Jaipur. The town stands on a ridge of yellowish sandstone and is crowned by the ancient Jaisalmer Fort. This fort contains a royal palace and several ornate Jain temples. Many of the houses and temples of both the fort and of the town below are built of finely sculptured sandstone. The town lies in the heart of the Thar Desert (the Great Indian Desert) and has a population, including the residents of the fort, of about 78,000. It is the administrative headquarters of Jaisalmer District. Jaisalmer was once the capital of Jaisalmer State.

Origin of name
Jaisalmer was founded by Rawal Jaisal in 1156 AD. Jaisalmer means the Hill Fort of Jaisal. Jaisalmer is sometimes called the "Golden City of India" because of the yellow sandstone used throughout the architecture of both the fort and the town below, imbues both with a certain golden-yellow light.

Geography and climate

Jaisalmer, being an arid desert region, is prone to extremes in terms of temperature. The temperature varies greatly from day to night in both summer and winter. Temperature of up to  have been recorded near the international border close to Pakistan, but standard conditions of this temperature recording remain unverified.

Demographics

According to the 2011 census, Jaisalmer had a population of 65,471. Around 90% of the population is Hindu, 8.20% is Muslim and the remaining are Sikhs, Christians, and Jains.

Economy 

Tourism is a major industry in Jaisalmer.
The Government of India initiated departmental exploration for oil in 1955–56 in the Jaisalmer area. Oil India Limited discovered natural gas in 1988 in the Jaisalmer basin.

Musicians and dancers are also a major cultural export from Jaisalmer to the rest of the world. Manganiyar musicians have played the world over, and Queen Harish, the dancing desert drag queen, has toured the world over and has featured in international movies.

Jaisalmer is also known for its leather messenger bags, made from wild camels native to the area.

Transport 

Jaisalmer is connected to the rest of Rajasthan by buses provided by Rajasthan State Transport Corporation as well as other private bus operators.

Jaisalmer Airport is located 17 kilometres southeast of Jaisalmer. Flights serve Mumbai, Delhi, Bangalore, Jaipur, Ahmedabad, Surat and Jodhpur.

Jaisalmer railway station runs daily trains between Jaisalmer and Jaipur, through which it is connected to Delhi and other cities all over India. This station comes under Jodhpur (JU) division of the Northwestern Railway (NWR). Additionally, there exists a luxury tourist train known as Palace On Wheels, which covers the major tourist destinations of Rajasthan, including Jaisalmer.

Places of interest

Jaisalmer Fort

Built in 1156 by the Bhati Rajput ruler Jaisal, Jaisalmer Fort, situated on Meru Hill and named as Trikoot Garh has been the scene of many battles. Its massive sandstone walls are a pale yellow colour during the day, turning to a darker gold as the sun sets. The famous Indian film director Satyajit Ray wrote a detective novel and later turned it into a film − Sonar Kella (The Golden Fortress) which was based on this fort. About a quarter of city's population still live inside the fort. The main attractions inside the fort are the Raj Mahal (Royal palace), Jain temples and the Laxminath temple.
te

Jain heritage of Jaisalmer
A number of the most ornate buildings in Jaisalmer were built by its Jain community, including temples, notably the temples dedicated to the 16th Tirthankara, Shantinath, and 23rd Tirthankara, Parshvanath.

There are seven Jain temples in total which are situated within the Jaisalmer fort built during the 12th and 15th centuries. Among these temples, the biggest is the Paraswanath Temple; the others are Chandraprabhu temple, Rishabdev temple, Shitalnath Temple, Kunthunath Temple, and Shantinath Temple. Known for their exquisite work of art and architecture that was predominant in the medieval era the temples are built out of yellow sandstone and have intricate engravings on them.

Jaisalmer has some of the oldest libraries of India which contain rarest of the manuscripts and artefacts of Jain tradition. There are many pilgrimage centres around Jaisalmer such as Lodhruva (Lodarva), Amarsagar, Brahmsar and Pokharan.

Museums
 Thar heritage museum 
 Baa RI Haveli On fort
 Desert Culture Centre & Museum
 Jaisalmer Folklore Museum
 Government Museum
 Jaisalmer Fort Palace Museum
 Jaisalmer War Museum
 Akal Fossil Park Museum
 Cactus Park Museum, Kuldhara
 Tanot Museum

Other

Ramdevra a village in Jaisalmer is named after Baba Ramdevji, a Tanwar Rajput and a saint who took Samādhi in 1384 CE, at the age of 33 years. He is worshiped today by many social groups of India as Ishta-deva.

 Gadisar Lake – Excavated in 1367 by Rawal Gadsi Singh, it is a scenic rainwater lake surrounded by the small temples and shrines of Amar Sagar. Earlier, this lake was used to be the main water source of Jaisalmer. Due to an increased water demand for agriculture, the lake is increasingly threatened to dry out.

In neighbourhood
Bada Bagh, a complex with chhatris of Jai Singh II (d. 1743) and subsequent Maharajas of Jaisalmer
Lodhruva
Desert National Park
Bhaniyana
Lanela
Battle of Longewala point

Desert festival

Desert Festival of Jaisalmer is the most awaited and famous cultural and colourful event of Rajasthan. Camel races, Turban-tying and Mr. Desert competitions are organised. It is held in the month of February every year. The festival showcases Rajasthani folk songs and dance and it is very attractive to foreign tourists. Gair and Fire dancers which are the major attraction of the Jaisalmer desert festival celebrations. This is the best time to visit Jaisalmer to witness performing arts like Kalbelia dances and folk songs and music.

In popular culture
Gupi Gayen Bagha Bayen (1969), a Bengali film, directed by Satyajit Ray, was partly shot at Jaisalmer Fort.
Sonar Kella (1974) (Golden Fortress) Satyajit Ray's Bengali film, based on his eponymous novel featuring his creation, the detective Feluda, was based in Jaisalmer and surrounding areas.
 Hothat Brishti, a Bengali film was shot in Jaisalmer.
 Goray Gondogol (2012), a Bengali film was partly shot in Jaisalmer.
 Kishore Kumar Junior (2018), a Bengali film was partly shot in Jaisalmer.
 Soul of Jaisalmer (Hindi non-feature film 2016) made by Abenezer Inder. This film is based on traditional water step well of Jaisalmer and was filmed in Gadsisar, Amar Sagar, Bada Bagh and many more far location of Jaisalmer.

See also 
Paramara, Dalvi-Deshmukh of Nasik originating from Jaisalmer
Indira Gandhi Canal
Pokhran
Rajkumari Ratnavati Girl's School, a school in the rural thar desert of Jaisalmer with unique architect
Baba Ramdevji, the 14th century ruler
Tanot Mata
Kuldhara

References

Further reading
Bhati, Hari Singh. 2002. ANNALS OF JAISALMER: A Pre-Mediaeval History. Kavi Prakashan, Bikaner.
Gahlot, Sukhvirsingh. 1992. RAJASTHAN: Historical & Cultural. J. S. Gahlot Research Institute, Jodhpur.
Somani, Ram Vallabh. 1993. History of Rajasthan.
Tod, James & Crooke, William. 1829. Annals & Antiquities of Rajasthan or the Central and Western Rajput States of India. 3 Vols. Reprint: Low Price Publications, Delhi. 1990.  (set of 3 vols.)
Spirit Desert Camp Best Desert Camp in Jaisalmer Visit https://campinjaisalmer.in/

External links

 
 
 

Cities and towns in Jaisalmer district
Former capital cities in India